Rory O'Connor (born 11 May 1994 in Australia) is an Australian rugby union player of Irish descent, who plays for the New South Wales Waratahs in Super Rugby. His playing position is prop. He has signed for the Waratahs squad in 2019.

Reference list

External links
Rugby.com.au profile
itsrugby.co.uk profile

1994 births
Australian rugby union players
Living people
Rugby union props
Melbourne Rising players
Melbourne Rebels players
New South Wales Waratahs players
Sydney (NRC team) players
Dallas Jackals players